Hey! Ho! Let's Go: The Anthology is a two–disc compilation that attempts to summarize the Ramones' career in its entirety. Every Ramones studio album is represented with the exception of Acid Eaters, their 1993 covers album. Some versions of this album include a hardcover 80-page booklet with liner notes by David Fricke and Danny Fields.

Two songs are billed as being previously unissued song versions: "Rock 'n' Roll High School" and "I Want You Around" are the original Ed Stasium mixes for the film Rock 'n' Roll High School, before they were remixed by Phil Spector for the accompanying soundtrack album. However, the Ed Stasium mix of "Rock 'n' Roll High School" had previously appeared on the 1988 compilation album Ramones Mania.

The album was certified platinum in Argentina as of 2001-04-24, selling more than 40,000 copies. It was also certified silver in the UK (more than 60,000 copies sold) as of December 24, 2004, and gold in Australia by 2006 selling more than 35,000 copies.

Stickers on the original boxset release advertised the collection humorously with the sum: "2 minutes + 3 chords x 58 tracks".

Track listing

Disc one

Disc two

Reissue
In 2001 (possibly because of Joey Ramone's death), Hey! Ho! Let's Go: The Anthology was re-released. This new version did not include the 80-page booklet and altered the track listing of CD 1. "I'm Affected" and "I Can't Make it on Time" were removed and replaced with "Baby I Love You", which was the band's highest charting hit in the UK.

Personnel
Ramones
Joey Ramone – lead vocals
Johnny Ramone – guitar
Dee Dee Ramone – bass guitar, backing vocals (disc 1: all tracks; disc 2: tracks 1-20)
C. J. Ramone – bass guitar, backing vocals (disc 2: tracks 21-25)
Marky Ramone – drums (disc 1: tracks 22-33; disc 2: tracks 1-5, 18-25)
Richie Ramone – drums (disc 2: tracks 6-17)
Tommy Ramone – drums (disc 1: tracks 1-21)

Additional musicians
Barry Goldberg – organ, piano
Benmont Tench – keyboards
Steve Douglas – saxophone
Graham Gouldman - backing vocals
Russell Mael - backing vocals
Ian Wilson – backing vocals
Rodney Bingenheimer - handclaps
Harvey Robert Kubernick – handclaps

Production
Jean Beavoir – mixing, original version recording producer, producer
Don Berman, Ian Bryan, Ron Cote, John Dixon, DJ Walker Bruce, Gold Andy Hoffman, Don Hunerberg, Ray Janos, Tom Lester, Robbie Norris, Garris Shipon, Harry Spiridakis, Joe Warda – assistant engineer
Keith Bessey, Robert Musso, Anders Oredson – engineer, mixing
Martin Bisi, Jorge Esteban, Harvey Goldberg, Judy Kirschner, Larry Levine, Boris Menart, Chris Nagle – engineer
Joe Blaney, Jason Corsaro – mixing
Tony Bongiovi, Ritchie Cordell, Graham Gouldman, Glen Kolotkin, Craig Leon, The Ramones, Phil Spector – original recording producer, producer
Sean Donahue – DJ
Tommy Ramone – associate producer, engineer, original recording producer, producer
Danny Fields, David Fricke – liner notes
Oz Fritz, Glenn Rosenstein – mixing assistant
Bryce Goggin – assistant engineer, engineer
Paul Hamingson – engineer, mixing assistant
Bill Inglot, Gary Stewart, Don Williams – compilation producer
Gary Kurfirst – executive producer
Bill Laswell, Dave Stewart – producer
Daniel Rey – musical coordination, original recording producer, producer
Donna Sekulidis – production coordination
Joel Soiffer – remixing
Ed Stasium – engineer, mixing, musical director, original recording producer, producer

Certifications

References 

1999 greatest hits albums
Albums produced by Ed Stasium
Albums produced by Graham Gouldman
Albums produced by Phil Spector
Albums produced by Tony Bongiovi
Ramones compilation albums
Rhino Records compilation albums
Albums produced by Tommy Ramone
Albums produced by Craig Leon
Albums produced by Glen Kolotkin